Jan Udo Holey (born March 22, 1967, in Dinkelsbühl), and often known by his pen name Jan van Helsing, is a controversial German author who embraces conspiracy theories involving subjects such as world domination plots by freemasons, Hitler's continuing survival in Antarctica following World War II, the structure of the earth as hollow, and others. His theories draw from sources such as The Protocols of the Elders of Zion.

His books Geheimgesellschaften (Secret Societies) and Geheimgesellschaften 2 have been banned in Germany, France and Switzerland for inciting anti-semitic hatred.

The majority of his books, such as Die Kinder des neuen Jahrtausends. Mediale Kinder verändern die Welt (Children of the New Millennium, and how They Change the World) are non-political and deal exclusively with esoteric subjects.

Life
Holey was the middle child of a wealthy family. His mother called herself a clairvoyant, and his father wrote three books dealing with gnostic and esoteric subject matter. Holey claims to have attended schools in Crailsheim, Bammental (near Heidelberg), Cambridge (in the United Kingdom), and Munich.

Holey chose his nom de plume "van Helsing", after he read Bram Stoker's vampire-novel Dracula at the age of fourteen.

Today, Holey runs his own publishing house, which publishes his own works as well as of others holding similar interests and viewpoints.

The  (the State Office for the Protection of the Constitution of Baden-Württemberg) first referred to Holey in a 1996 report entitled "Rechtsextremistische Einflußnahme auf die Esoterikszene" (Right-Wing Extremist Influences on the Esoteric Scene).

Political opinions
Holey draws from many esoteric and conspiracy theories, many of which originate in the United States of America. His writings encompass such varied themes as Nostradamus, reincarnation, conspiracy theories regarding John F. Kennedy and Uwe Barschel's murders.  According to his detractors, Holey's books are largely plagiarized from other sources, many of which are conspiracy theorists of questionable repute.  The author believes he is banned as part of a larger conspiracy.

In Geheimgesellschaften, Holey combines science-fiction, esotericism, Nazi-mythology, ufology and "Zionist global domination" theories.  He also employs The Protocols of the Elders of Zion as a source.  He believes the Rothschilds head a Jewish conspiracy to rule the world and associates them with a mysterious cabal called the Illuminati, who plan a New World Order.  Holey and his followers claim that they are not anti-semitic, but rather that they speak out against powerful Jewish interests in high finance and politics.

Publications
Books published under his pen name Jan van Helsing:
 Geheimgesellschaften und ihre Macht im 20. Jahrhundert, 1995, 
 Geheimgesellschaften 2 (das Interview), 1995, 
 Buch 3 – Der dritte Weltkrieg, 2005, 
 Unternehmen Aldebaran, 1997, 
 Hände weg von diesem Buch, 2004, 
 Wer hat Angst vor'm schwarzen Mann...?, 2005, 

Books published under his real name Jan Udo Holey:
 Die Akte Jan van Helsing, 
 Die innere Welt, 
 Die Kinder des neuen Jahrtausend, 2005,

References

External links
 Jan Udo Holey's Website (German)
 Article debunking Geheimgesellschaften (Part 1) (German)
 Article debunking Geheimgesellschaften (Part 2) (German)

1967 births
Living people
Occultism in Nazism
German conspiracy theorists
Antisemitism in Germany